Czekanowo may refer to:

 Czekanowo, Kuyavian-Pomeranian Voivodeship, village in North-central Poland.
 Czekanowo, Greater Poland Voivodeship, village in West-central Poland.

See also 

 Czekanów (disambiguation)
 Chekanovo